A skyscraper is a very tall, continuously habitable building.

Skyscraper or Sky Scraper may also refer to:

Arts and entertainment

Films
 Skyscraper (1928 film), an American silent drama movie
 Skyscraper (1959 film), an American short film directed by Shirley Clarke and Willard Van Dyke
 Skyscraper (1996 film), a direct-to-video movie starring Anna Nicole Smith
 Skyscraper (2011 film), a Danish drama movie
 Skyscraper (2018 film), an American action film
 Skyscrapers (1906 film), an American silent film

Magazines and comics
 Skyscraper (magazine), an independent quarterly music magazine
 Skyscraper, one of the Maximums team members, DC Comics super heroes

Music
 Skyscraper (band), a UK rock band

Albums
 Skyscraper (album) or the title song, by David Lee Roth, 1988
 Skyscraper (soundtrack), from the 2018 film
 Skyscraper, by Tall Stories, 2009

Songs
 "Skyscraper" (song), by Demi Lovato, 2011; covered by Sam Bailey, 2013
 "Skyscraper", by Bad Religion from Recipe for Hate, 1993
 "Skyscraper", by the Boo Radleys from Everything's Alright Forever, 1992
 "Skyscraper", by Newsted from Metal, 2013
 "Skyscraper", by Train from For Me, It's You, 2006
 "Skyscrapers", by OK Go from Of the Blue Colour of the Sky, 2010

Theatre
 Skyscraper (musical), a 1966 Tony Award-nominated musical
 Skyscraper (play), a 1997 off-Broadway comedy play by David Auburn

Science and technology
 Skyscraper sheaf, a mathematical object
 Skyscraper, a variety of sunflower
 Skyscraper, a type of web banner used for online advertising
 Skyscraper, a type of triangular Moonraker (sail)

Sport
 Skyscraper (horse), winner of the 1789 Epsom Derby
 The Skyscrapers (wrestling), World Championship Wrestling tag team
 Stefan Struve (born 1988), Dutch mixed martial arts fighter, nickname Skyscraper

Structures
 Nebotičnik, Slovenian for "skyscraper", in Ljubljana, Slovenia
 Sky Scraper (Ferris wheel), at Lagoon Amusement Park, Farmington, Utah, US
 Skyscraper (roller coaster), an upcoming roller coaster at the SkyPlex complex in Orlando, Florida, US
 The Skyscraper (Dubai), a cancelled high-rise building project

Other uses
 Skyscraper! Achievement and Impact, an exhibit at the Liberty Science Center, New Jersey, US

See also

 
 
 Sky Scrapper, a rollercoaster at World Joyland in Wujin, Changzhou, Jiangsu, China
 Scrape (disambiguation)
 Sky (disambiguation)